Claas-Peter Fischer (born 22 February 1968) is a German rower. He competed in the men's coxless four event at the 1996 Summer Olympics.

References

External links
 

1968 births
Living people
German male rowers
Olympic rowers of Germany
Rowers at the 1996 Summer Olympics
Sportspeople from Bremerhaven